This Conversation Is Ending Starting Right Now is the third full-length album by the indie rock/emo band Knapsack. It was released on September 8, 1998, on Alias Records, and re-released in 2014 by Poison City Records. The album title comes from lyrics for the song "Skip The Details."

Critical reception
The Morning Call called the album "full of clever, hook-laden and emotional tunes." Spin, in an article about undeservedly obscure bands, wrote that This Conversation Is Ending Starting Right Now is "a minor classic of twentysomething despair." The A.V. Club thought that the album lacked the "desperate declarations" of Day Three of My New Life.

Track listing 
 "Katherine the Grateful" - 3:17
 "Change Is All the Rage" - 3:27
 "Shape of the Fear" - 4:25
 "Cold Enough to Break" - 3:20
 "Skip the Details" - 2:53
 "Arrows to the Action" - 3:28
 "Cinema Stare" - 3:04
 "Hummingbirds" - 4:42
 "Balancing Act" - 3:40
 "Please Shut Off the Lights" - 3:51

References

1998 albums
Knapsack (band) albums